Greater Hume Shire is a local government area in the Riverina region of southern New South Wales, Australia. The Shire was formed in 2004 incorporating Culcairn Shire, the majority of Holbrook Shire and part of Hume Shire. The shire had an estimated population of 10,137 as at 2012.

The Shire is located adjacent to the Hume, Olympic and Riverina Highways and the Sydney–Melbourne railway.

The mayor of the Greater Hume Shire Council is Cr. Heather Wilton, an independent politician.

Town and localities
Major towns in the Shire are Holbrook and Culcairn.  Other towns are: Brocklesby, Bungowannah, Burrumbuttock, Gerogery and Gerogery West, Henty, Jindera, Morven, Walbundrie and Walla Walla.

Towns such as Howlong, were cut off from Hume Shire in the amalgamation. Howlong is now a part of Federation Council.

Council

Current composition and election method
Greater Hume Shire Council is composed of nine councillors elected proportionally as three separate wards, each electing three councillors. All councillors are elected for a fixed four-year term of office. The mayor is elected by the councillors at the first meeting of the council. The most recent election was held on 10 September 2016, and the make-up of the council is as follows:

The current Council, elected in 2016, in order of election, is:

See also
 Riverina Water County Council

References

 
Local government areas of New South Wales
Local government areas of the Riverina
Hume Highway